Sex and Violence may refer to:

In music:
Sex and Violence (album), a 1992 album by Boogie Down Productions
"Sex & Violence", a song by The Exploited from the 1981 album Punks Not Dead
"Sex and Violence", a song by the Scissor Sisters from their 2010 album Night Work
"Sex and Violence", a song by the thrash metal band Carnivore from the album Retaliation.
In film and television:

The Muppet Show: Sex and Violence, a television special that served as a pilot episode for The Muppet Show
 "Sex and Violence" (Supernatural), an episode of the television series Supernatural
"Sex and Violence," a Monty Python's Flying Circus episode
"Sex and Violence," the fifth episode of Men Behaving Badly
"Sex and Violence," an unscreened episode of Doomwatch
Sex and Violence, a film written and directed by John Zibell
"Gender Education", an episode of The Goodies also known as "Sex and Violence"
Sex & Violence (TV series), by Thom Fitzgerald

In comics:
The Savage Dragon: Sex & Violence, a two-issue miniseries in the Savage Dragon comic book franchise

See also:
Gender and violence
Sexual violence
Sex & Violins, a 1995 album by Rednex